Stuck in Love may refer to:

 Stuck in Love (film), a 2012 film
 "Stuck in Love" (song), a 2000 song by the Judds

See also
 "Stuck on Love", a 1983 song by Stephen Cummings